Annabella Emma Azín Arce (born 30 May 1961) is an Ecuadorian politician, doctor of medicine, and wife of Álvaro Noboa she has four children. She is the president of the Crusade for a New Humanity Foundation, caring for those afflicted by disease for over 20 years. She has participated in protest marches against the government of Rafael Correa.

Azín has been a member of the National Congress of Ecuador for Guayas Province and a member of the Ecuadorian Constituent Assembly, both times representing the Institutional Renewal Party of National Action. She was a binomial candidate for the office of Vice President of Ecuador with her husband in the Ecuadorian presidential elections of 2009 and 2013.

Biography

Azín was born on 30 May 1961, the first of three daughters to Giorgio Azín and Grecia Arce. She obtained a doctorate in medicine from the Catholic University of Santiago de Guayaquil.

Azín hosted the 2015 Ecuador Fashion Week on 17 September and received gifts from CN Modelos and Karla Benítz. She accepted the invitation of Cecilia Niemes, director of Ecuador Fashion Week, to host the venue after Azín completed her master's degree.

Azín has campaigned for the creation of a successor to the political party PRIAN.

On 9 October 2022 she was given a national award by Virgilio Saquicela and Marcela Holguín. The award was for the Crusade for a New Humanity Foundation which she chairs.

Citations

1961 births
Living people
Members of the National Congress (Ecuador)
Institutional Renewal Party of National Action politicians
Universidad Católica de Santiago de Guayaquil alumni
Ecuadorian physicians
People from Guayaquil
21st-century Ecuadorian women politicians
21st-century Ecuadorian politicians